Shah Rukh Khan is an Indian actor, producer and television personality who works in Hindi films. He began his acting career by playing a soldier in the Doordarshan series Fauji (1988), a role that garnered him recognition and led to starring roles in more television shows. He soon started receiving film offers and had his first release with the romantic drama Deewana (1992), in which he played a supporting part. Khan subsequently played villainous roles in the 1993 thrillers Baazigar and Darr, box office successes that established his career in Bollywood. In 1995, Khan starred opposite Kajol in Aditya Chopra's romance Dilwale Dulhania Le Jayenge, that became the longest running Indian film of all time. He continued to establish a reputation in romantic roles by playing opposite Madhuri Dixit in Chopra's Dil To Pagal Hai (1997), and Kajol in the Karan Johar-directed Kuch Kuch Hota Hai (1998) and Kabhi Khushi Kabhie Gham... (2001).

In 1999, Khan collaborated with Aziz Mirza and Juhi Chawla to start a production company, Dreamz Unlimited, whose first release was the comedy-drama Phir Bhi Dil Hai Hindustani (2000) starring Khan and Chawla. The film was a commercial failure as was their next production, Aśoka (2001), leading to a setback. His career prospects improved in 2002 when he starred alongside Dixit and Aishwarya Rai in Devdas, a period romance that garnered him critical acclaim. In 2004, he collaborated with his wife Gauri Khan to launch another company, Red Chillies Entertainment, whose first feature was the box office hit Main Hoon Na (2004). Khan's popularity continued to increase in the 2000s as he played the romantic lead opposite younger actresses, most notably Rani Mukerji and Preity Zinta, in several top-grossing productions, including Kal Ho Naa Ho (2003), Veer-Zaara (2004) and Kabhi Alvida Naa Kehna (2006). He also played against type as a NASA scientist in the drama Swades (2004), a hockey coach in the sports film Chak De! India (2007), and an autistic man in the drama My Name Is Khan (2010). 

From 2007 onwards, Khan began to star opposite a third generation of heroines, most notably Deepika Padukone in Om Shanti Om (2007) and Anushka Sharma in Rab Ne Bana Di Jodi (2008). He went on to co-star with Padukone in the action-comedies Chennai Express (2013) and Happy New Year (2014), and reunited with Kajol in Dilwale (2015), all of which were among the biggest Hindi film grossers of the decade. He then starred alongside Sharma in Jab Harry Met Sejal (2017) and Zero (2018), both of which were commercially unsuccessful.

With eight Filmfare Awards for Best Actor, he shares the record for the most wins in the category with Dilip Kumar. Khan has also starred in several non-fiction films that have documented his popularity, including the documentary The Inner and Outer World of Shah Rukh Khan (2005). From 2003 onwards, he has hosted several award ceremonies, including ten Filmfare Awards and six Screen Awards. In addition, he has featured as the host of television game shows Kaun Banega Crorepati (2007) and the talk show TED Talks India (2017–2019).

Filmography

Feature films

Other crew positions

Documentaries

Television

As an actor

As a host

Music videos

See also 
 List of awards and nominations received by Shah Rukh Khan

Footnotes

References

Bibliography

External links 
 
 Shah Rukh Khan on Bollywood Hungama

Indian filmographies
Male actor filmographies
Filmography